Cecil Payne Stadium is a multi-purpose stadium located in Roodepoort, a suburb of Johannesburg, South Africa. It is currently used mostly for football matches and is set to be utilized as a training field for teams participating in the 2010 FIFA World Cup after being brought up to FIFA standards.

References

Soccer venues in South Africa
Sports venues in Johannesburg